HMS Foresight was one of two Forward-class scout cruisers built for the Royal Navy during the first decade of the 20th century. The ship was in reserve for most of the first decade of her existence. After the beginning of the First World War in August 1914, she was initially assigned to the Dover Patrol and was then transferred to the 8th Destroyer Flotilla. Foresight was sent to the Mediterranean in mid-1915 and was then assigned to the Aegean Sea a year later, together with her sister ship, and remained there until the end of the war. After returning home in 1919, she was sold for scrap in 1920.

Design and description
The Forward-class ships were one of four classes of scout cruisers ordered by the Admiralty in 1902–1903 and 1903–1904 Naval Programmes. These ships were intended to work with destroyer flotillas, leading their torpedo attacks and backing them up when attacked by other destroyers, although they quickly became less useful as destroyer speeds increased before the First World War. Their crew consisted of 289 officers and ratings.

The ships were powered by a pair of three-cylinder triple-expansion steam engines, each driving one shaft, using steam provided by a dozen Thornycroft boilers.

The main armament of the Forward class consisted of ten quick-firing (QF) 12-pounder  18-cwt guns. Three guns were mounted abreast on the forecastle and the quarterdeck, with the remaining four guns positioned port and starboard amidships. They also carried eight 3-pounder Hotchkiss guns and two above-water 18-inch (450 mm) torpedo tubes, one on each broadside.

Construction and career
HMS Foresight was laid down by the Fairfield Shipbuilding and Engineering Company at their Govan shipyard on 24 October 1903, launched on 8 October 1904 and completed on 8 September 1905. Not long after completion, two additional 12-pounder guns were added and the 3-pounder guns were replaced with six QF 6-pounder Hotchkiss guns. The ship was in the reserve of the Portsmouth Division of the Home Fleet from completion until October 1909, when she joined the 2nd Destroyer Flotilla as its leader. In 1910 she joined the 3rd Destroyer Flotilla, then in 1911 the 6th Flotilla at Dover. About 1911–1912, her main guns were replaced by nine  guns, arranged four on each broadside and the remaining gun on the quarterdeck. Foresight was reduced to reserve in early 1912. In November 1913, she accidentally collided with the destroyer .

At the start of the First World War she was assigned to the Dover Patrol, then the 8th Destroyer Flotilla, still at Dover. She took part in the operations off the Flanders coast during October 1914 that helped to protect the Allied flank during the battle of the Yser. In May 1915 she was temporarily transferred to the 6th Light Cruiser Squadron on the Humber, guarding against Zeppelin raids on the east coast. In 1915 she served in the Mediterranean and in July 1916 in the Aegean with her sister ship HMS Forward until the end of the war. In November 1916, she assisted the wounded survivors of HMHS Britannic and was paid off in June 1919. The ship was sold for scrap on 3 March 1920.

Notes

Footnotes

Bibliography

External links
 Forward class in World War I
 History of the Forward class

 

Forward-class cruisers
World War I cruisers of the United Kingdom
1904 ships
Ships built on the River Clyde